Ninibeth Beatriz Leal Jiménez (born November 26, 1971) is a Venezuelan model, businesswoman and beauty queen who won Miss World Venezuela 1991 and  Miss World 1991. She is the fourth Miss World titleholder from Venezuela.

Miss World
In a pageant held in Atlanta, Georgia, she was crowned Miss World 1991 on December 28. Leanne Buckle of Australia and Diana Tilden-Davis of South Africa were her runners-up. Sandra Foster of Jamaica and Michelle McLean of Namibia completed the Top 5.

Life after Miss World
After Ninibeth fulfilled her Miss World duties, she got married and moved to Australia to continue modelling. She and her husband had two kids, Valentino and Lucciana. The couple divorced in 2008. Ninibeth is now a businesswoman still living in Australia.

References

External links
Miss Venezuela Official Site
Miss World Official Site

1971 births
Living people
Miss Venezuela World winners
Miss World winners
Miss World 1991 delegates
People from Maracaibo
Venezuelan emigrants to Australia
Venezuelan beauty pageant winners